The 1932 Volta a Catalunya was the 14th edition of the Volta a Catalunya cycle race and was held from 4 September to 11 September 1932. The race started and finished in Barcelona. The race was won by Mariano Cañardo.

Route and stages

General classification

References

1932
Volta
1932 in Spanish road cycling
September 1932 sports events